Hannelore Anke (later Hofmann; born 8 December 1957) is a retired German swimmer who competed for East Germany in the 1970s.

Personal life
Anke was born in 1957 in Bad Schlema. Her mother had a senior position in a textile manufacturing plant and her father was a decorative painter. The sixth of ultimately seven children, she was the first god-child of Wilhelm Pieck, who at the time of her birth was president of East Germany.

Sports career
Anke became junior-champion at the 1971 Junior European Swimming Championships. She had her best achievements in the 100 m breaststroke and 4 × 100 m medley relay. In these two events she won gold medals at the 1976 Summer Olympics and 1975 World Aquatics Championships, and set two world records. In 1975, she also won a world title in the 100 m breaststroke. She was inducted into the International Swimming Hall of Fame in Fort Lauderdale, Florida in 1990.

Doping
Officials from the East German team have later admitted that they administered performance enhancing drugs to Anke during her career.

See also
 List of members of the International Swimming Hall of Fame

Notes

References

External links

 

1957 births
Living people
People from Erzgebirgskreis
East German female swimmers
Olympic swimmers of East Germany
Swimmers at the 1972 Summer Olympics
Swimmers at the 1976 Summer Olympics
Olympic gold medalists for East Germany
Doping cases in swimming
German sportspeople in doping cases
World record setters in swimming
East German female breaststroke swimmers
World Aquatics Championships medalists in swimming
Medalists at the 1976 Summer Olympics
Olympic gold medalists in swimming
East German sportspeople in doping cases
Sportspeople from Saxony